August Bellanca (1880–1969) was an American labor activist who was a founder and three-time vice president of the Amalgamated Clothing Workers of America (ACWA). The ACWA was formed as an offshoot of United Garment Workers and was the result of tensions between the national union and urban locals. Bellanca served as vice president at intervals over a period of fifty years, from 1916-1934, 1946-1948 and also from 1952-1966.

Early life 

Bellanca was born in Sciacca, Sicily in 1880. He migrated to the United States in 1900. He was the brother of Giuseppe Bellanca, an aeronautical designer, and Frank Bellanca, a labor leader and businessman. In August 1918, Bellanca married Dorothy Jacobs Bellanca, also a prominent labor leader with origins in the ACWA. Dorothy Bellanca would rise to prominence as a defender of women's rights among the male-dominated ACWA. They had no children, and lived in New York City. The two devoted their lives to the ACWA and were long-time proponents of trade unionism.

Career 

Before 1914, the garment workers were part of the United Garment Workers, although after the 1910 Chicago general strike, the UGW began refusing to support its members, and even started to actively work against members in urban areas. The UGW had a tendency towards conservatism while the workers had socialist ties.
In 1913 Bellanca was crucial in bringing strong support from Italian workers to the 1913 New York Garment workers strike. He concentrated his efforts on preventing Italian scabs from crossing picket lines.

Bellanca united with his friend, future congressman and three-term New York City mayor Fiorello LaGuardia, in an attempt to prevent rifts between Italian and Jewish union members. Their combined efforts were successful and served as an introduction between LaGuardia and New York labor leaders. LaGuardia benefited when he ran for mayor in 1933, when he was able to garner support from both Jewish and Italian immigrants.
The strike became the final act for the UGW, which once again sided with manufacturers. In 1914 Bellanca followed the lead of Sidney Hillman and founded ACWA.

World War II and anti-Fascist activities 

Bellanca was strongly anti-Fascist and helped create the Mazzini Society, an American organization devoted to opposing Benito Mussolini. He was crucial in organizing aid to Italy following the War. In 1957, Bellanca was recognized by the Italian Government with the Italian Order of Merit, and in 1967 was bestowed the Knight of the Grand Cross of the Order of Merit of the Republic of Italy.

References

1880 births
1969 deaths
People from Sciacca
Italian anti-fascists
Italian emigrants to the United States